The 1964 Campeonato Nacional de Fútbol Profesional, was the 32nd season of top-flight football in Chile. Universidad de Chile won their fourth title, also qualifying for the 1965 Copa de Campeones.

League table

Results

Topscorer

References

External links
ANFP 
RSSSF Chile 1964

Primera División de Chile seasons
Chile
Prim